Syvaske is an urban-type settlement in Henichesk Raion, Kherson Oblast, southern Ukraine. Syvaske belongs to Novotroitske settlement hromada, one of the hromadas of Ukraine. Until 1935, it was called Rozhdestvenskoye. Population:

Administrative status 
Until 18 July, 2020, Syvaske belonged to Novotroitske Raion. The raion was abolished in July 2020 as part of the administrative reform of Ukraine, which reduced the number of raions of Kherson Oblast to five. The area of Novotroitske Raion was merged into Henichesk Raion.

Economy

Transportation
It is on the line connecting Melitopol with Henichesk and Syvash. There is infrequent passenger traffic. The railway used to continue to Dzhankoi and Simferopol, but after the Russian annexation of Crimea in 2014, the traffic to Crimea was discontinued.

The settlement has access to Highway M18 which runs north to Melitopol and Zaporizhzhia and south to the border with Crimea.

See also 

 Russian occupation of Kherson Oblast

References

Urban-type settlements in Henichesk Raion